Virden (West) Airport  was located  northwest of Virden, Manitoba, Canada.

See also
Virden/R.J. (Bob) Andrew Field Regional Aerodrome
Virden (Gabrielle Farm) Airport

References

Defunct airports in Manitoba